Ribeirão Grande is a municipality in the state of São Paulo in Brazil. The population is 7,679 (2020 est.) in an area of 333 km2. The elevation is 690 m.

The municipality contains part of the  Serra do Mar Environmental Protection Area, created in 1984.
It contains the  Xitué Ecological Station, created in 1987.
It contains part of the  Intervales State Park, created in 1995, including the park's headquarters.

References

Municipalities in São Paulo (state)